The 2017 WFG Tankard, the Quebec men's provincial curling championship was held from January 8 to 15 at the Aréna de Lévis in Lévis, Quebec. The winning Jean-Michel Ménard team represented Quebec at the 2017 Tim Hortons Brier in St. John's, Newfoundland and Labrador. The event was held in conjunction with the 2017 Quebec Scotties Tournament of Hearts.

Teams
Teams are as follows

Round-robin standings

Scores
Draw 1
Roy 11-5 Blair
Morissette 9-4 Lawton
Benoit 8-4 Martel
Ferland 9-2 Beaufort
Fournier 9-6 Vezeau

Draw 2
Munroe 6-3 Chartrand
Beaufort 7-5 Vezeau
Ferland 8-2 Drapeau
Martel 8-6 Ménard
Benoit 10-5 Lawton

Draw 3
Morissette 7-3 Blair

Draw 4
Fournier 11-3 Drapeau
Roy 7-4 Martel
Munroe 9-4 Vezeau
Ménard 9-3 Lawton
Ferland 8-4 Chartrand

Draw 5
Morissette 6-3 Martel
Ménard 6-5 Blair
Roy 8-7 Benoit

Draw 6
Vezeau 6-4 Chartrand
Munroe 7-5 Fournier
Beaufort 9-1 Drapeau

Draw 7
Ménard 7-0 Benoit
Roy 5-4 Morissette
Martel 9-3 Lawton

Draw 8
Ferland 8-1 Vezeau
Fournier 8-3 Chartrand
Munroe 7-5 Beaufort

Draw 9 
Beaufort 6-5 Fournier
Ferland 9-5 Munroe
Drapeau 6-3 Vezeau

Draw 10
Benoit 8-7 Morissette
Martel 9-7 Blair
Roy 7-6 Ménard

Draw 11
Ferland 10-5 Fournier
Chartrand 9-5 Beaufort
Munroe 6-3 Drapeau

Draw 12
Lawton 7-4 Roy
Morissette 7-5 Ménard
Blair 6-5 Benoit

Draw 13
Chartrand 4-3 Drapeau
Blair 8-6 Lawton

Tiebreakers
Ménard 8-5 Martel
Beaufort 3-2 Fournier

Championship round

Scores
Draw 14
Ménard 6-5 Ferland
Roy 9-5 Beaufort
Morissette 9-4 Munroe

Draw 15
Roy 8-3 Munroe
Morissette 8-4 Ferland
Ménard 8-3 Beaufort

Draw 16
Morissette 5-3 Beaufort
Ménard 9-2 Munroe
Ferland 7-6 Roy

Playoffs

1 vs 2
Saturday, January 15, 7:30 pm

3 vs 4
Saturday, January 15, 7:30 pm

Semifinal
Sunday, January 16, 8:15 am

Final
Sunday, January 16, 3:45 pm

References

Quebec Men's Provincial Curling Championship
Curling competitions in Quebec
Lévis, Quebec
Quebec Men's Provincial
January 2017 sports events in Canada